Austrian Museum of Folk Life and Folk Art is a folk museum in Vienna, Austria.

External links

 

Museums in Vienna
Folk museums in Europe
Buildings and structures in Josefstadt